Urticicola perchtae is a fossil species of air-breathing land snail, a  terrestrial pulmonate gastropod mollusk in the family Helicidae, from the Early/Middle Miocene of Sandelzhausen (type locality) and Oggenhausen, southern Germany.

References

Hygromiidae
Miocene gastropods
Neogene Germany
Fossils of Germany
Fossil taxa described in 2013